Diluviicola is a genus of fungi in the Annulatascaceae family of the Ascomycota. The relationship of this taxon to other taxa within the Sordariomycetes class is unknown (incertae sedis), and it has not yet been placed with certainty into any order. Diluviicola is monotypic, containing the single species Diluviicola capensis, described as new to science in 1998.

References

Monotypic Sordariomycetes genera
Annulatascaceae